Slavko Perović (born 9 June 1989, in Kragujevac) is a Serbian footballer  who plays as a striker.

Career
His senior first team debut occurred for FK Obilić towards the end of 2004–05 season, setting the record as youngest player in Serbian football league history - he was only 15 years and 10 months old, breaking Rambo Petković's previous record. That game was played against his former club Red Star Belgrade.

Biggest achievement in his career where in shirt of Turkish 1.Lig club Manisaspor where in season 2013-2014 Slavko Perovic was pronounced for best league scorer, with 19 goals scored in 1.Lig competition.

In 2019, he joined Liga I club Dinamo București. He was released in August 2020.

Career statistics

Honours
Red Star Belgrade 
Serbian Cup (1): 2009–10

References

External links
 
 
 Profile at Srbijafudbal
 Slavko Perović Stats at Utakmica.rs
 

1989 births
Living people
Sportspeople from Kragujevac
Serbian footballers
Association football forwards
Serbia under-21 international footballers
FK Obilić players
FK Srem players
Red Star Belgrade footballers
FK Napredak Kruševac players
FK Rad players
Manisaspor footballers
Alanyaspor footballers
Denizlispor footballers
İstanbulspor footballers
FC Dinamo București players
Serbian SuperLiga players
TFF First League players
Liga I players
Expatriate footballers in Turkey
Serbian expatriate sportspeople in Turkey
Expatriate footballers in Romania
Serbian expatriate sportspeople in Romania